Oxyresveratrol is a stilbenoid. It is found in the heartwood of Artocarpus lakoocha and in the traditional drug 'Puag-Haad' made from it. It is also the aglycone of mulberroside A, a compound found in Morus alba, the white mulberry.

Oxyresveratrol is a potent tyrosinase inhibitor.

References 

Stilbenoids